Riccardo Dalisi (May 1, 1931 – April 9, 2022) was an Italian architect, designer and artist.

References 

1931 births
2022 deaths
21st-century Italian architects
Italian designers
People from Potenza